Lerdo may refer to:

 Lerdo, Durango, Mexico
 Lerdo Municipality, Mexico
 Lerdo, California, United States
 Lerdo Landing, Baja California, Mexico